The A15 highway is a highway in Lithuania (Magistraliniai keliai). It runs from Vilnius to the Belarusian border near Šalčininkai. The length of the road is around 49 km.

References

Roads in Lithuania
European route E85